Lahey Health System, commonly known as Lahey Health, is an organization based in Burlington, Massachusetts that manages hospitals, physicians and other health services in northeastern Massachusetts. When formed in 2012, the organization was estimated at a value of $1.2 billion. As of 2013, it had hospitals in Burlington, Peabody, Beverly, and Gloucester, including Lahey Hospital & Medical Center, Beverly Hospital and Addison Gilbert Hospital.

References

External links
 Official site

Health care companies based in Massachusetts
Organizations established in 2012
2012 establishments in Massachusetts